BSC Spartak Moscow is a professional beach soccer team associated with the soccer club FC Spartak Moscow based in Moscow, Russia. Their best result to date internationally was reaching the final of the 2020 Mundialito de Clubes.

Current squad

Head coach:  Dmitry Nezhelev

Notable former players
  Bruno Xavier da Silva

References

BSC
Russian beach soccer teams